Mohan Lal Baklial was an Indian politician. He was elected to the Lok Sabha, lower house of the Parliament of India as a member of the Indian National Congress.

References

External links
Official biographical sketch in Parliament of India website

India MPs 1957–1962
India MPs 1962–1967
Lok Sabha members from Madhya Pradesh
Indian National Congress politicians
1901 births
Year of death missing